Lyda N. Green (born October 16, 1938 in Livingston, Texas) is a retired educator and Republican politician in the U.S. state of Alaska. Green, as a political newcomer, was elected to the Alaska Senate in 1994, defeating a 22-year Democratic incumbent in a district representing most of the population of the Matanuska-Susitna Borough. Two Democratic members of the Alaska House of Representatives, also from the Matanuska-Susitna Valley, were defeated in the same election. Green served a total of fourteen years in the Senate and was its president in her final two years in office.

Political career
Lyda Green was a member of the Alaska Senate, serving from 1995 to 2009. She was first elected in 1994 by defeating Democratic incumbent Jalmar M. "Jay" Kerttula, who was the longest-serving member in the history of the Alaska Legislature. Kerttula was long regarded as vulnerable, and was re-elected in 1984 with under 52% of the vote just as the Matanuska-Susitna Borough was starting to trend Republican. He was twice re-elected after that against veteran campaigners. Given the political atmosphere at the time, Green benefited from being a first-time candidate running against an incumbent who had been in office for over 30 years.

She was elected the Senate President in 2007 when 6 Republicans split from their colleagues to form a ruling coalition with all 9 Democrats in the Senate.
Senator Green decided not to run for reelection in 2008 and was replaced by Republican Senator Linda Menard, whose husband Curtis had served in the Senate several years before Green.

Relationship with Sarah Palin
Green has been critical of Alaskan Governor Sarah Palin. When US Senator John McCain of Arizona nominated Palin to be his vice presidential running mate in the 2008 US presidential election, Green said:She's not prepared to be governor. How can she be prepared to be vice president or president? Look at what she's done to this state. What would she do to the nation?
The statement was made in the context of an oil tax increase Palin supported, as well as a $500 million state subsidy to a Canadian firm for a natural gas pipeline project, even though the pipeline was not guaranteed.

Personal life
Lyda graduated from Brazosport High School in 1956 and received a B.B.A. degree from Sam Houston State University in 1959.

Lyda is married to Curtis Green, who is an agent for State Farm Insurance and was previously a district manager for State Farm in Alaska.  Curtis Green has also been a long-time political ally of Dick Randolph. They have two sons, Shelton and Bradley. Their daughter, Kristie owns an insurance agency in Kenai and is married to Tuckerman Babcock, a former official in the Wally Hickel and Mike Dunleavy administrations, and a past chairman of the Alaska Republican Party.

References

External links
 Senator Lyda Green official government website
 Project Vote Smart - Senator Lyda Green (AK) profile
 Follow the Money - Lyda N. Green
 2006 2004 2002 2000 1998 1994 campaign contributions
 Lyda Green at 100 Years of Alaska's Legislature

1938 births
Republican Party Alaska state senators
Businesspeople from Anchorage, Alaska
Living people
Politicians from Anchorage, Alaska
People from Freeport, Texas
People from Livingston, Texas
People from Wasilla, Alaska
Presidents of the Alaska Senate
Sam Houston State University alumni
Women state legislators in Alaska
21st-century American politicians
21st-century American women politicians